Palais Wilczek is a palace in Vienna, Austria. It was owned by the noble Wilczek family. The palace, as it stands now, was built on the site of the former Brassican family palace between 1722 and 1737 (exact date unknown). What is known is that in 1728 the palace came into the possession of Lower Austrian  Carl Ignaz Lempruch. The Wilczek family came into possession of the palace in 1825.
The palace is located between Palais Herberstein and Palais Modena. Franz Grillparzer and Joseph von Eichendorff have both resided in Palais Wilczek.

Wilczek
Innere Stadt